Potterchitto Creek is a stream in the U.S. state of Mississippi.

Potterchitto is a name derived from the Choctaw language purported to mean either (sources vary) "broad" or "big furrow/big valley". Variant names are "Poto Chitto Creek", "Pottok Chetto Creek", and "Pottoxchitto Creek".

References

Rivers of Mississippi
Rivers of Newton County, Mississippi
Mississippi placenames of Native American origin